The Mudfog Papers are an anthology of stories written by Charles Dickens and published from 1837 to 1838 in the monthly literary journal Bentley's Miscellany, which he was then editing.

Topics
The Mudfog Papers relates the proceedings of a fictional society, The Mudfog Society for the Advancement of Everything, a Pickwickian parody of the British Association for the Advancement of Science. The latter, founded in York in 1831, was one of  numerous Victorian learned societies dedicated to the advancement of science. Like The Pickwick Papers, The Mudfog Papers claims affinity with parliamentary reports, memoirs and posthumous papers. The serial was illustrated by George Cruikshank.

The fictional town of Mudfog was based on Chatham in Kent, where Dickens spent part of his youth. When Oliver Twist first appeared in Bentley's Miscellany in February 1837, Mudfog was described by Dickens as the town where Oliver was born and spent his early years, making Oliver Twist related to The Mudfog Papers, but this allusion was removed when the novel was published as a book.

At the conclusion of his first contribution, about the mayor of the provincial town of Mudfog, Dickens explains that "this is the first time we have published any of our gleanings from this particular source", referring to The Mudfog Papers. He also suggests that "at some future period, we may venture to open the chronicles of Mudfog".

The Papers was first published as a book under the title The Mudfog Papers and Other Sketches in 1880.

Contents

I.   Public Life of Mr Tulrumble – Once Mayor of Mudfog 
II.  Full Report of The First Meeting of The Mudfog Association for The Advancement of Everything
III. Full Report of The Second Meeting of The Mudfog Association for The Advancement of Everything
IV.  The Pantomime of Life
V.   Some Particulars Concerning a Lion
VI.  Mr Robert Bolton: The "Gentleman Connected with the Press" 
VII. Familiar Epistle from a Parent to a Child Aged Two Years and Two Months

References

External links
 The Mudfog Papers at Google Books
Full text of The Mudfog Papers
The Mudfog Papers on readeasily.com
The Mudfog Papers on Project Gutenberg
 
Turn the pages of a digital copy of Mudfog Papers and Other Contributions. University of California
Review of The Mudfog Papers in The New York Times of October 2, 1880

1837 short stories
1880 short story collections
Art by George Cruikshank
Short story collections by Charles Dickens
Works originally published in Bentley's Miscellany